The Inter-Prefectural Women's Ekiden is an annual women's ekiden (road running relay race) for Japanese runners held in January in Kyoto Prefecture. The course has a looped point-to-point format over the marathon distance of 42.195 km and begins and ends within the Nishikyogoku Athletic Stadium.

The competition was initiated in 1983 as a way of developing and improving the standard of women's long-distance running in Japan. All 47 Prefectures of Japan are allowed to enter a team into the event. The relay is divided into nine stages (or legs) of distances varying from 3 km to 10 km. Rather than being open to all, the stages are separated into age groups; competitors range from junior high school runners to fully-fledged professional athletes. This aspect is an essential part of the ethos of the competition: that younger athletes may interact and learn from more experienced runners. Non-Japanese nationals are not permitted to enter the competition and participants must represent the prefecture in which they are being schooled or, in the case of professionals, the prefecture in which they are mostly based.

The ekiden is organised by the Japanese Association of Athletics Federations (JAAF), the national governing body for the sport. It has three major sponsors: the Kyoto Shimbun (the regional newspaper), Murata Machinery, and NHK (the national broadcaster). The event is transmitted every year on the NHK General TV channel as well as NHK Radio 1.

The host prefecture, Kyoto, has historically been the most successful team at the competition by far, having won the ekiden on sixteen occasions. Hyogo and Chiba Prefecture are the next most successful, having won the event three times each. The event is among the most prestigious of the national women's running competitions and it attracts  Japan's top runners within all the age ranges. Prominent women athletes to have competed at the event include: Olympic marathon champions Naoko Takahashi and Mizuki Noguchi, former world record holder Kayoko Fukushi, Vienna Marathon winner Tomo Morimoto and two-time Asian Games silver medallist Harumi Hiroyama.

The current course record of 2:14:55 hours was set by Kanagawa Prefecture in 2013.

Stages

Editions

Key:

References

Statistics
Top-10 Stage times . Women's Ekiden. Retrieved on 2012-01-22.
Historical Annual Rankings . Women's Ekiden. Retrieved on 2012-01-22.

External links
Official website

Ekiden
Road running competitions in Japan
Sport in Kyoto Prefecture
Recurring sporting events established in 1983
Women's athletics competitions

